Marcus Pattillo (born September 29, 1977, in Kennett, MO) is an American former Major League Baseball (MLB) umpire, who worked as a fill-in in during 2014 and 2015 MLB seasons. He wore number 18.

As of 2015, Patillo's regular duties involve umpiring in the Triple-A Pacific Coast League. He was the home plate umpire in a semifinal game of WBSC Premier12 (2015). There are opinions that he showed controversial ball-strike calls likely to help the host country win the game, however, the Japan team's bullpen blew their lead in the 9th inning, losing the game.

See also 
 List of Major League Baseball umpires

References

External links
Retrosheet

1977 births
Major League Baseball umpires
Living people